Afrogethes canadensis is a species of pollen beetle in the family Nitidulidae.

References

 Audisio, P., A. R. Cline, A. De Biase, G. Antonini, E. Mancini, M. Trizzino, L. Costantini, et al. (2009). "Preliminary re-examination of genus-level taxonomy of the pollen beetle subfamily Meligethinae (Coleoptera: Nitidulidae)". Acta Entomologica Musei Nationalis Pragae, vol. 49, no. 2, 341–504.

Further reading

 Arnett, R.H. Jr., M. C. Thomas, P. E. Skelley and J. H. Frank. (eds.). (2002). American Beetles, Volume II: Polyphaga: Scarabaeoidea through Curculionoidea. CRC Press LLC, Boca Raton, FL.
 
 Richard E. White. (1983). Peterson Field Guides: Beetles. Houghton Mifflin Company.

Nitidulidae
Beetles described in 1955